Eupithecia pseudexheres is a moth in the family Geometridae. It is found in Madagascar.

References

Moths described in 1972
pseudexheres
Moths of Madagascar